Yttrium(III) arsenide (YAs) is an inorganic chemical compound.

References

Arsenides
Yttrium compounds
Rock salt crystal structure